Neoma may refer to:

NEOMA Business School, a French Business School
Neoma (beetle), a genus of insects
Lumeneo Neoma, a city electric car manufactured by Lumeneo in France
Nyoma, a town in Northern India
Noema, a technical term in phenomenology to describe a type of thought
Nǐ hǎo ma? (你好嗎), a Mandarin Chinese expression written in Pinyin which means "How are you?"

See also 
Ni Hao (disambiguation)